Armand Raimbault (born 21 February 1976, Blois) is a French football goalkeeper. He currently plays for US Orléans.

External links

1976 births
Living people
French footballers
Association football goalkeepers
Tours FC players
Ligue 2 players